Dmitry Chepovetsky (born 1970) is a Canadian actor, best known for his role of Bob Melnikov in the TV series ReGenesis.

Early life and education
Chepovetsky was born in Lviv, Ukraine. His family left in 1976 along with waves of other Jewish olim bound for Israel. Along the way, his family experienced an eight-month stopover in Italy while awaiting their travel visas. They then decided to change course for Regina, where his uncle lived. Since then, Chepovetsky has been splitting his time between Vancouver and Toronto, where he’s been living for the past eight years, close to his older brother and nieces.

Career
Chepovetsky acted in his first musical at the age of 14 while in high school in Regina, then began acting in local community. Thinking briefly about a different career path, he was accepted to the University of Toronto on a scholarship for its commerce program. But after three weeks he dropped out to work as an elf at Casa Loma and then worked numerous jobs until he got to Ryerson Theatre School. He also trained with David Rotenberg and Carol Rosenfeld, as well as Kate Hale at the Foursight Theatre. Aside from his numerous acting credits, among them stints on critically acclaimed TV shows and feature films such as The X-Files, Lucky Number Slevin and Stargate, Chepovetsky is likely best known for his recurring role on ReGenesis as Bob Melnikov, the show’s lead biochemist and a person with Asperger syndrome. The role has garnered him two Gemini Award nominations for best actor in a dramatic series; once in 2005 and another in 2007. The show has reached 120 countries in over 18 languages. He also played a role in the video game Outriders as Jakub Dabrowski. Chepovetsky has played historical figure Nikola Tesla in four episodes of long running detective series Murdoch Mysteries.

Personal life
Chepovetsky enjoys photography, music, movies, theatre and writing.

Filmography

Film

Television

Theater

Awards and nominations

References

External links

1970 births
Living people
Canadian male film actors
Canadian people of Ukrainian-Jewish descent
Canadian male television actors
Male actors from Toronto
Soviet emigrants to Canada